The Basilan Strait is a strait of water separating the islands of Mindanao and Basilan in the Philippines.

It was above sea level during the last ice age.

References

Straits of the Philippines
Landforms of Basilan
Geography of Zamboanga City